Acton is an unincorporated community in Harris County, in the U.S. state of Georgia.

History
A post office called Acton was established in 1891, and remained in operation until 1909. The name is a transfer from Acton, London.

Location
Acton is located along Georgia State Route 315 approximately 2 mi (3 km) west from its intersection with Interstate 185.

References

Unincorporated communities in Harris County, Georgia